The 1967 Canadian motorcycle Grand Prix was the twelfth round of the 1967 Grand Prix motorcycle racing season. It took place on the weekend of 30 September 1967 at the Mosport Park circuit in Bowmanville, Canada. This was multiple champion Mike Hailwood's last FIM championship event.

History

The Canadian Grand Prix was added to the calendar in 1967 as the penultimate round of the 50cc, 125cc, 250cc and 350cc categories and as the final round of the 500cc category. This happened at the same time as Canada celebrating its 100th birthday of independence, the reason being why the race was organised by the Federal Centennial Commission. Despite it being the season finale, the Canadian Grand Prix was unpopular. The FIM had sanctioned the event because the organisers had delayed the race by one week. As a result, the FIM punished them by prohibiting the organisers to host a Canadian GP the following year. While there were a decent amount of 5000 spectators compared to the United States Grand Prix held two years earlier, the private riders who normally participated decided not to participate in this race due to the disproportionate starting fees being offered compared to the travel costs. Because of this, only a handful of factory riders participated along with a big number of Canadians and Americans, with the latter outnumbering the former in the 125 and 250cc classes. To date, the 1967 event is the first and only Canadian Grand Prix ever held.

In 2017, on the dates of 10 to 12 August, a reunion was held to celebrate the 50-year anniversary of the 1967 race. The event was organised by Canada’s Vintage Road Racing Association as part of the annual Mosport Vintage Festival. Alongside the normal race program, a series of parades were held featuring some of the actual motorcycles and riders who participated in the 1967 Canadian Grand Prix.

500 cc classification

250 cc classification

125 cc classification

References

  
  
 

Motorcycle Grand Prix
Canadian
Canadian motorcycle Grand Prix